This is a list of speakers of the House of Commons of Great Britain from 1707 to 1800 and the House of Commons of the United Kingdom from 1801.

For the 'prolocutors' and speakers of the House of Commons of England, see List of speakers of the House of Commons of England.

List of speakers

Speakers of the House of Commons of Great Britain, 1707–1800
The Kingdom of Great Britain was created by the Acts of Union 1707. At the beginning of 1801, Great Britain was combined with the Kingdom of Ireland to form the United Kingdom of Great Britain and Ireland, with a single House of Commons serving the whole kingdom.

John Smith, Speaker of the House of Commons of England since October 1705, was elected the first Speaker of the House of Commons of Great Britain.

Speakers of the House of Commons of the United Kingdom from 1801
The United Kingdom of Great Britain and Ireland was created in 1801. In 1922 the Irish Free State ceased to be part of the UK. The official name of the United Kingdom was changed to the United Kingdom of Great Britain and Northern Ireland, in 1927.

Notes

References

Bibliography

 List
 List
 List
Lists of British MPs
Lists of United Kingdom MPs
British House Of Commons